Uashat is an Indian reserve in Quebec, located adjacent to the city of Sept-Îles.  Together with Maliotenam some distance away, it forms the Innu community of Uashat-Maliotenam.

Prior to December 24, 1993, it was known as the Indian reserve of "Sept-Îles", sharing the name with the adjacent city.

References

Innu communities in Quebec
Communities in Côte-Nord
Sept-Rivières Regional County Municipality